Frank McGowan may refer to:
Frank McGowan (priest) (1895–1968), Anglican priest
Frank McGowan, a character in the 1995 film Village of the Damned
Beauty McGowan (Frank Bernard McGowan, 1901–1982), American baseball player

See also
Francis McGowan (disambiguation)